"When It Rains It Pours" is a song co-written and recorded by American country music singer Luke Combs. It was released in June 2017 as the second single from his debut album This One's for You (2017). Written by Combs, Ray Fulcher and Jordan Walker, the song is about a man gaining a streak of luck after his girlfriend left him, something that Combs had similarly gone through that acted as the basis for the song's creation. "When It Rains It Pours" reached number one on both the Billboard Country Airplay and Hot Country Songs charts respectively, giving Combs his second number-one country hit overall. It also charted at number 33 on the Hot 100 chart. The song was certified 8× Platinum by the Recording Industry Association of America (RIAA), and has sold 8,000,000 units as of March 2023. It achieved similar chart success in Canada, giving Combs his first number-one hit on the Canada Country chart and peaking at number 54 on the Canadian Hot 100. It garnered a 2× Platinum certification from Music Canada. Although it didn't chart in Australia, it was certified 6x Platinum by the Australian Recording Industry Association (ARIA), denoting sales of 420,000 units in that country. An accompanying music video for the single, created by TA Films, retells the song's story. It was nominated for Video of the Year at the 2018 CMT Music Awards. For promotion, Combs performed the song live on Jimmy Kimmel Live! and CMT Crossroads with Leon Bridges.

Background and development
Taste of Countrys Sterling Whitaker described the song as "a more uptempo, lighthearted song that turns the old woe-is-me phrase on its ear with a savvy twist." In the song, the narrator humorously recalls a streak of favorable occurrences beginning with his girlfriend leaving him. Combs co-wrote the track with Jordan Walker of the country music duo Walker McGuire, and they both met with Ray Fulcher at a Nashville bar where they talked about wanting to write a song together, and went over the idea at Walker's house. The song's inspiration came from Combs having gone through a breakup and Walker suggesting that it be about making his ex-girlfriend mad.

Commercial performance
"When It Rains It Pours" first entered the Billboard Country Airplay chart dated July 1, 2017, at number 56, and the Hot Country Songs chart at number 43 the same week. It reached atop the Country Airplay chart the week of November 3 and the Hot Country Songs chart three weeks later. On the Billboard Hot 100, it debuted at number 85 the week of August 19. Eleven weeks later, it peaked at number 33 the week of November 3, and remained on the chart for twenty weeks. The song was certified triple platinum by the Recording Industry Association of America (RIAA) on August 22, 2018, and has sold 459,000 copies in the United States as of August 2018.

In Canada, the song debuted at number 96 on the Canadian Hot 100 the week of September 9, peaked at number 54 for two non-consecutive weeks, and stayed on the chart for twenty weeks. It was certified double platinum by Music Canada on August 23, 2018.

Music video
The music video was created by TA Films. The song's music video retells the story, featuring Combs encountering his ex-girlfriend, and then driving, celebrating with his friends, getting a phone number from a waitress (played by his then-girlfriend, now wife Nicole Hocking), and celebrating over winning money on a lottery ticket. On June 6, 2018, it was nominated for Video of the Year at the 2018 CMT Music Awards, but lost to "I'll Name the Dogs" by Blake Shelton.

Live performances
On November 8, 2017 (recorded October 2), Combs performed the track along with "One Number Away" on Jimmy Kimmel Live! after the 51st Annual Country Music Association Awards. On June 28, 2018, he performed it on CMT Crossroads as a duet with Leon Bridges.

Personnel
From This One's for You liner notes.

Musicians
 Luke Combs – lead vocals
 Dave Francis – bass guitar
 Wil Houchens – organ
 Sol Philcox-Littlefield – electric guitar
 Scott Moffatt – acoustic guitar, electric guitar, background vocals, synthesizer, programming
 Gary Morse – pedal steel guitar, lap steel guitar
 Jerry Roe – drums

Technical
 Jim Cooley – mixing
 Scott Moffatt – producer

Charts

Weekly charts

Year-end charts

Decade-end charts

Certifications

References

2017 singles
Columbia Records singles
Luke Combs songs
Songs written by Luke Combs
2017 songs